Miguel Cotto vs. Canelo Álvarez was a professional boxing event which took place on November 21, 2015 at the Mandalay Bay Events Center in Paradise, Nevada. It was televised by HBO pay-per-view.

November 21
Alvarez won the fight on November 21, a day that has proven good for Mexican boxers fighting Puerto Ricans in major fights, as was the case in 1987 when Julio César Chávez beat Edwin Rosario, by technical knockout in round eleven, also in Las Vegas.

Vargas vs. Miura fight
The co-feature of the fight were Takashi Miura, defending the WBC world super featherweight title against Francisco Vargas, who is the mandatory challenger. Vargas defeated Miura via ninth-round technical knockout (TKO) victory, which eventually named The Ring magazine Fight of the Year for 2015.

Fight card

References

Cotto
2015 in sports in Nevada
2015 in boxing
November 2015 sports events in the United States